Lieutenant General Francis M. Beaudette is a retired United States Army officer who served as the commanding general of the United States Army Special Operations Command from 2018 to 2021.

Military career
Francis M. Beaudette was commissioned in 1989 as an Intelligence Officer through the Reserve Officers' Training Corps program at The Citadel in Charleston, South Carolina. He initially served as a Military Intelligence Officer, in his first assignment he served as a Battalion Assistant S-2, M1A1 crewmember, and armor platoon leader in Germany, Saudi Arabia and Iraq. He went on to complete Special Forces training in 1995. His first assignment was to the 3rd Special Forces Group (Airborne), where he commanded two Special Forces Detachments, commanded the Group Headquarters Company, and served as the Group assistant S-3. He then served as the Aide-de-Camp to the Commanding General of the John F. Kennedy Special Warfare Center and School, and went on to serve as Aide-de-Camp to the Deputy Commanding General of Kosovo Forces.

Beaudette commanded a Special Forces company at Fort Carson, Colorado, and in Kosovo, as well as served as a Battalion Executive Officer and Group Operations Officer for the 10th Special Forces Group (Airborne), both at Fort Carson and in Iraq.
Following a tour on the Joint Staff in the J3 Deputy Directorate for Special Operations, Beaudette commanded 1st Battalion, 10th Special Forces Group (Airborne) in Germany and Special Operations Task Force 10 in Afghanistan. He then served as the G3 and Chief of Staff for the United States Army Special Forces Command (Airborne), prior to commanding the 1st Special Forces Group (Airborne) and the Joint Special Operations Task Force – Philippines. Beaudette then served as the Executive Officer to the commander, United States Special Operations Command. Beaudette served as the Deputy Commanding General, 1st Armored Division and Director of United States Central Command Forward (Jordan). He then served with Joint Special Operations Command as the Assistant Commanding General.
Beaudette assumed command United States Army Special Operations Command on June 8, 2018. He relinquished command of USASOC to Jonathan P. Braga on August 13, 2021 and retired the same day.

Beaudette is a graduate of The Citadel, the United States Army Command and General Staff College and the United States Army War College.

Awards and decorations

References

United States Army personnel of the Iraq War
United States Army personnel of the Gulf War
United States Army personnel of the War in Afghanistan (2001–2021)
Living people
Recipients of the Defense Superior Service Medal
Recipients of the Distinguished Service Medal (US Army)
Recipients of the Legion of Merit
The Citadel, The Military College of South Carolina alumni
United States Army officers
United States Army War College alumni
Year of birth missing (living people)